Campodonico is a surname of Italian origin. Notable people with this surname include:

 César Campodónico (1929-2005), Uruguayan actor
 Elida Campodónico (1894-1960), Panamanian teacher, women's rights advocate and attorney
 Juan Campodónico (born 1971), Uruguayan musician, producer, composer, creator
 Mariano Campodónico (born 1974), retired Argentine footballer who played as forward 
 Pablo Campodónico (born 1977), Argentine professional footballer 
 Rodolfo Campodónico, one of the first composers of waltzes in Mexico